The Section of the Old City Walls are the remains of a wall that surrounded the colonial city of Macau, in Portuguese Macau, in the 16th and 17th centuries. 

The wall's construction is unique because it was built of clay, sand, rice straw, rocks, and oyster shells.

History
Its construction began as early as 1569, and the wall was used as a defensive measure against attacks by the Chinese and other invaders. 

After a failed attempt by the Dutch to invade the city in 1622, it was fortified and greatly improved to withstand future military attacks. Because the wall was not properly maintained, it slowly collapsed over time, and only small portions still remain.

Conservation
The Section of the Old City Walls is now part of the  UNESCO Historic Centre of Macau World Heritage Site.

See also
List of oldest buildings and structures in Macau

References

Buildings and structures in Macau
Macau
Historic Centre of Macau
Portuguese Macau
History of Macau
Portuguese colonial architecture in China